Master Gee may refer to:

 Master Gee (musician), member of hip hop and funk group The Sugarhill Gang
 Master Gee (wrestler) (born 1947), retired American professional wrestler

See also

 Master of G
 Mister G (disambiguation)
 Mr G